Grigoriy Avksentiyevich Dovzhenko (22 April 1899 – 21 April 1980) was a Ukrainian muralist, Honoured Artist of USSR, member of the Union of Artists of Ukraine.

Biography 
Grigoriy Avksentiyevich Dovzhenko was born on 22 April (10 April old style) 1899, in Poltavka village (now Bashtanka, Mykolaiv Oblast, Ukraine).  
In 1907 – 1913 he studied in Poltava local school (2 classes). In 1913 his family moved to Gvozdievka village in Siberia. In 1916 Grigoriy Dovzhenko moved to Omsk, where he was working as a porter. At the same time he passed exams without attending the higher school.
In 1917 Dovzhenko began studying at the Red Arts of Siberia. At the same time he was working as a postman and a warden at Akmolinsk veterinary department.

Profession 

 1918 – 1920 – works as an illustrator in Siberia oblast' printing agency (Omsk), performed settings for the opera "Prince Igor" staged in Siberia State Opera House
 1920 – 1921 – works as a scene painter in Siberia State Opera House, then in the fall 1921 he with his family returned to Ukraine, where he's working as a drawing teacher in Mykolaiv area department of political awareness
 1922 – Grigoriy Dovzhenko enters Odessa Art Institute. In 1923 – 1924 he took a journey over Ukraine, making a lot of drawings, landscape and still-life pictures
 1925 – his works are presented at the exhibition of students' works at Odessa Art Institute. At this time he enters the Association of Revolutionary Art of Ukraine (ARAU), and is elected its secretary in Odessa branch
 1926 – work on the picture "Song about Freedom". Grigoriy is elected the delegate of all-Ukrainian ARAU congress
 1927 – work on the decoration of the Eastern Chamber of Commerce in Odessa. In May Grigoriy Dovzhenko graduated from the Odessa Art Institute with qualification of artist-muralist
 1928 – work on the decoration of Farmers' Sanatorium VUTSIK. Grigoriy as well is working as drawing teacher at that time
 1930 – 1936 – Grigoriy is a teacher at Kiev Art Institute (currently – National Art and Architecture Academy). In 1930 he also worked as an artist at Odessa movie studio
 1941 – as the World War II began, Grigoriy Dovzhenko evacuated to Tajikistan, where he worked as a teacher and the secretary of Tajikistan Union of Artists committee. He also was involved in the construction works at power plant near Dushanbe, published a lot of antifascist drawings
 1945 – enters Red Army, sniper school. This year Grigoriy Dovzhenko enters the Communist Party and after the WWII was over, returned to Ukraine
 1948 – obtains inventor's certificate for fine art technique from the USSR Council of Ministers' State Committee for Inventions and Discoveries
 1953 – 1960 – teacher at Kiev school of arts and crafts
 1956 – elected the delegate of the III session of USSR Union of Artists
 1957 – elected the delegate of the I session of USSR Union of Artists
 18 December 1979 – awarded the title of Honoured Artist of Ukrainian SSR

Main works 

 1920 – settings for the opera "Prince Igor" staged in Siberia State Opera House
 1923 – 1924 – various landscape and still-life pictures made during his journey over Ukraine
 1926 – picture "Song about Freedom"
 1927 – decoration of the Eastern Chamber of Commerce in Odessa
 1928 – sketches and decoration of Farmers' Sanatorium VUTSIK
 1929 – decoration of the Press House named after Kotsiubynsky in Odessa
 1930 – works as an artist at Odessa Film Studio, at the movies production: "Perekop", "25000", "Parents' Right", "Museum Guard"
 1930 – 1936 – a series of landscapes is done during journey to Crimea
 1934 – picture "Cheapskate Nest"
 1936 – picture "Shevchenko in casemate"
 1940 – picture "Shchors' death"
 1947 – series of fresco portraits "Ukrainian partisans", "Portrait of a girl", etc.
 1950 – decoration of Novo-Gorlovka Palace of Culture
 1951 – 1954 – decoration of Summer Theatre, Palace of Culture, residential houses and facilities for the children in Nova Kakhovka
 1955 – decoration of Palace of Culture named after I.Franko (Donetsk)
 1956 – pictures "Golden autumn", "Over the Dnieper", "Botanical garden", "Still-life with fish", "Flowers", etc.
 1957 – decoration of Palace of Culture "Kharchovyk" (Kiev)
 1958 – 1963 – series of decorations for various buildings in Rovno, Ivano-Frankivsk, Kiev; after trip to Baltics republics creates number of landscapes
 1965 – monumental paintings with polymeric material application: "Ornamental motif", "A woman with wheat", "Cossack Mamay", etc.
 1970 – fresco paintings "Worker and Kolkhoz Woman", "Revolution is coming" etc. in Palace of Culture in Chernihiv. Series of sketches "Skify", "Yaroslav' message", "Golden Gate", "Prince Igor" etc.
 1971 – mosaic "Kyi, Shchek and Khoryv" in "Rovesnik" movie theatre (Kiev)
 1972 – 1975 – decoration of the library for youth (Kiev); fresco portraits of Taras Shevchenko, Lesya Ukrainka, I.Franko
 1976 – 1979 – decoration of Palace of Culture in Lozova, Kharkiv Oblast'; series of portraits of Ukrainian culture activists: A. Dovzhenko, O.Soroka, M. Leontovych, G.Veryovka, V.Sosyura, etc.

Grigoriy Dovzhenko had a son, Taras Dovzhenko (b. 1931), who became a Merited Architect of Ukraine (1994).

Grigoriy Dovzhenko died on 21 April 1980 in Kiev and was buried on Baikove Cemetery.

References 

1899 births
1980 deaths
Muralists
Artists from Kyiv
20th-century Ukrainian painters
20th-century Ukrainian male artists
Ukrainian male painters